Lyrkeia is a village and a former municipality in Argolis, Peloponnese, Greece. Since the 2011 local government reform it is part of the municipality Argos-Mykines, of which it is a municipal unit. The municipal unit has an area of 245.194 km2. Population 2,058 (2011).

References

Populated places in Argolis